Thomas Qian Yurong (1914 – March 22, 2013) was the Roman Catholic bishop of the Roman Catholic Diocese of Xuzhou, China.

Ordained to the priesthood in 1945, he was ordained a bishop by the Chinese government without papal approval in 1959. However, in 2007, Qian Yurong received papal approval. He retired in 2011.

Notes

1914 births
2013 deaths
20th-century Roman Catholic bishops in China
21st-century Roman Catholic bishops in China